The Museum of the City of San Francisco is a nonprofit museum containing a collection of historic artifacts related to San Francisco.  It was founded by Gladys Hansen, who was the city archivist of San Francisco. The executive director is Richard Hansen, Gladys's son.

History

The Museum of the City of San Francisco was founded in 1991 by Gladys Hansen, who had recently retired as the city archivist of San Francisco. It was recognized as the official historical museum of San Francisco by the Board of Supervisors in 1995. The museum had a small exhibit space at The Cannery (a former Del Monte fruit-canning plant that is now a shopping center) until 2000, when it lost its lease. It then had temporary exhibits at Pier 45 (near Fisherman's Wharf) and at San Francisco City Hall.

In February 2002, the Museum of the City of San Francisco merged with the San Francisco Historical Society to create the San Francisco Museum and Historical Society. San Francisco municipal government recognized the newly merged organization as the official historical museum of San Francisco, since it was the successor to the Museum of the City of San Francisco. One of the purposes of the merger of the two organizations was to put together a single proposal to renovate and operate the Old San Francisco Mint as a history museum, which ultimately did not succeed.

Notwithstanding the merger, the Museum of the City of San Francisco's website, operated directly by Gladys Hansen, remained independent and in 2003 renamed itself the Virtual Museum of the City of San Francisco. Hansen's personal research collection of artifacts from the 1906 San Francisco earthquake also remained in her possession. In 2013, it started partnering with the Bethlehem Shipyard Museum on exhibits, and it displayed some of its artifacts in the San Francisco History Museum, near Union Square.

In 2019, the Virtual Museum of the City of San Francisco dropped "Virtual" from its name and reverted to its original name, after the San Francisco Museum and Historical Society dropped "Museum" from its name and reverted to its original name.

References

External links
Museum of the City of San Francisco

San Francisco
Failed museum proposals in the United States
Non-profit organizations based in San Francisco
History of San Francisco